The National Democrats Forum is a political party in Uganda founded in 1990. It is led by Karuhanga Chapaa. 

Political parties in Uganda